Jiří Dvořák (born 4 February 1967 in Brno) is a Czech actor. He starred in the film Operace Silver A under director Jiří Strach in 2007.

Dubbing Works

Films
(2010) Red Dragon (Francis Dolarhyde) (Ralph Fiennes)
(2010) Clash of the Titans (Hádes) (Ralph Fiennes)
(2010) Sunshine (Ignatz Sonnenschein / Adam Sors / Ivan Sors) (Ralph Fiennes)
(2006) Hamlet (Hamlet) (Mel Gibson)

TV shows
The Game of Thrones (Tyrion Lannister)
Rome (Titus Pollo)
ER (Luka Kovač)
CSI: Crime Scene Investigation (Nick Stokes)
Dead Zone (Johnny Smith)
Sliders (Quinn Mallory)
Star Trek: Enterprise - (Johnatan Archer) (Series 1 and 2

References

External links 
Czech Dubbing forum

Czech male film actors
Czech male stage actors
1967 births
Living people
Actors from Brno
Janáček Academy of Music and Performing Arts alumni
Czech male voice actors